This is a glossary of medical terms related to communication disorders which are psychological or medical conditions that could have the potential to affect the ways in which individuals can hear, listen, understand, speak and respond to others.

A

B

C

D

E

G

H

I

K

L

M

N

O

P

R

S

T

U

V

W

References

External links
Glossary of medical terms related to communications disorders 

Communication disorder
Communication disorders
Wikipedia glossaries using description lists